Raúl Alejandro Ocasio Ruiz (born January 10, 1993), known professionally as Rauw Alejandro, is a Puerto Rican singer and songwriter. Referred to as the "King of Modern Reggaeton", he belongs to "the new generation" of Puerto Rican urban musicians. His debut studio album, Afrodisíaco, was released in November 2020. His second studio album, Vice Versa, released in June 2021, featured the lead single "Todo de Ti". He has won two Latin Grammy Awards from twelve nominations.

Life and career 
Raúl Alejandro Ocasio Ruiz was born on January 10, 1993, in San Juan, Puerto Rico and was raised in Canóvanas and Carolina. His father, guitarist Raúl Ocasio, and his mother, backing vocalist María Nelly Ruiz, introduced him to some of his musical influences like Elvis Presley, Michael Jackson, and Chris Brown. For many years, Alejandro and his father lived in the mainland United States, mainly Miami and New York City, where he got inspiration from the R&B and dancehall genres. Alejandro and fellow Puerto Rican rapper Anuel AA are childhood friends; they both went to the same school and had classes together. As a child, Alejandro competed in school talent shows because he has a passion for dancing. After graduating high school, he enrolled at University of Puerto Rico. From the age of six until he was twenty, he played soccer, but later quit because he "could not perform as he expected to" and suffered an injury at age 20. He moved to Orlando, Florida to attempt to get scouted to play in the Premier Development League (PDL), but eventually was unsuccessful.

After quitting soccer, he was left in a light depression, so to improve his mood he decided to switch to a musical career and began to publish songs through SoundCloud in 2014. In November 2016, he released his debut mixtape titled Punto de Equilibrio. In January 2017, he signed a music deal with Duars Entertainment. In 2018, he was chosen by Sony Music Latin to be part of "Los Próximos", a musical project in which the label sought to enlist new musical talents. The musical project helped him gain fame, and as a result other notable artists noticed him and he was featured in multiple collaborations like Kevin Roldán and Khea's "Pa' Tu Casa", and "Luz Apagá" by Ozuna, Lunay and Lyanno that year. In December 2017, he released his first single as a lead artist, titled "Toda" with Alex Rose. It peaked at the 29th spot on the Billboard Hot Latin Songs charts in November 2018. A remix of "Toda" featuring Cazzu, Lenny Tavárez, and Lyanno was released in May 2018. The song proved successful, with the music video having over 1 billion views on YouTube as of November 2020. In January 2019, he released his single "Que le dé" with Nicky Jam. In December 2019, his song "Fantasias" with Farruko peaked at the number 12 spot on the US Latin chart, which is also the highest position his songs have reached on the chart, along with "Tattoo". Both songs stayed for 20 weeks on the chart, the highest duration for one of Alejandro's songs to date and won the Latin Grammy Award for Best Urban Fusion/Performance in 2021.

Alejandro's debut album, Afrodisíaco, was released on November 13, 2020. It was preceded by the release of the songs and music videos, "Enchule", the "Elegí" remix, and "Reloj", with Anuel AA.

On May 20, 2021, he released "Todo de Ti", which peaked at the number 2 spot on Spotify's Top Songs Global chart. On June 25, 2021, he released his album,Vice Versa, through Sony Music Latin. Afrodisíaco earned him a nomination for Best Música Urbana Album at the 64th Annual Grammy Awards.

Artistry 
Rauw Alejandro's music style includes Latin R&B, reggaeton, rhythmic pop, and ballads. Billboard commented that it has helped "set him apart from a growing class of pop-leaning reggaetoneros". He was influenced early on by Presley and Jackson, and later by Ricky Martin, Daddy Yankee, and Chris Brown. He also cites Ciara as a musical inspiration.

Personal life 
Since late 2021, he has been in a relationship with Spanish singer Rosalía. The two had worked together on his debut studio album, Afrodisíaco, which was released on November 13, 2020.

Discography 

 Afrodisíaco (2020)
 Vice Versa (2021)
 Saturno (2022)

Filmography 
 Sky Rojo (2023)

Awards and nominations 

Alejandro is the recipient of numerous awards. This includes a Latin Grammy Award, a Latin American Music Award, and an MTV Millennial Award. He has also been nominated for a Grammy Award.

Tours 
 Fantasias Tour (2020)
 Rauw Alejandro World Tour (2021)
 Vice Versa Tour (2022)
 Saturno World Tour (2023)

Notes

References

External links 
 
 Rauw Alejandro at CMTV

1993 births
Living people
21st-century American singers
Latin Grammy Award winners
Latin trap musicians
Puerto Rican hip hop musicians
Puerto Rican rappers
Puerto Rican reggaeton musicians
Rauw Alejandro
Singers from San Juan, Puerto Rico
Spanish-language singers
Spanish-language singers of the United States
Urbano musicians
Sony Music Latin artists
Latin music songwriters